Veun Sai District is a district located in Ratanakiri Province, in north-east Cambodia. The town of Veun Sai is located in the district. It is approximately 38 km north by road of Banlung and is located on the Tonlé San River.  The headquarters of Virachey National Park are located in the village. The village is populated by Khmers and many ethnic minorities including Kreung, Lao, and Chinese. Across the Tonle San river are a small Lao village and a small Chinese village.

Administration
The district is subdivided into nine communes (khum), which are further subdivided into 34 villages (phum).

See also
Lygosoma veunsaiense first discovered at Veun Sai in 2010.

References

External links
 http://dg.travelnow.com/index.jsp?action=viewLocation&locationId=27207&cid=130178

Districts of Ratanakiri province